Hewgill is a surname. Notable people with the surname include:

Catherine Hewgill (born 1963), Australian cellist
Roland Hewgill (1929–1998), Canadian actor